Vezmedar (also Romanized as Vezmādār and Vazmadar) is a village in Pachehlak-e Gharbi Rural District, in the Central District of Azna County, Lorestan Province, Iran. At the 2006 census, its population was 142, in 27 families.

References 

Towns and villages in Azna County